Day & Meyer, Murray & Young is a secure warehouse storage facility in Manhattan, New York. It was established in 1928 with the merger of Day & Meyer with Murray & Young. The facility offers storage location for antiquities, fine arts, and other valuable objects to its clients.

External links

References

Companies based in Manhattan
1920 establishments in New York City